Patrick Gathara (born 1972) is a Kenyan journalist, cartoonist, blogger, and author. He is also a regularly published commentator on regional and international affairs. His work has appeared in multiple publications, including The Washington Post, Al Jazeera, and The Star.

Gathara is currently a curator for Kenyan news site The Elephant. He is also the author of Gathara Will Draw for Food, a collection of his political cartoons and commentary on the Kenyan political scene.

Cartoon style 
Gathara draws in pencil, preferring delicate shading to allow his subjects to emerge from the page rather than be defined by a series of strong ink lines. He focuses on faces, with his subject's foreheads narrowed, the cheekbones and jowls extended, and the ears exaggerated.

References 

1972 births
Living people
Kenyan bloggers
Kenyan journalists
20th-century Kenyan writers
Place of birth missing (living people)
21st-century Kenyan writers
Kenyan cartoonists